Yerik may refer to:

People
 Yerik Asanbayev (1936–2004), Kazakh statesman and vice-president
 Yerik Utembayev, Kazakh diplomat

Places
 Yerik, Belgorod Oblast, Russia
 Yerik, Volgograd Oblast, Russia